HMS Chequers was a  destroyer, of the "Ch" subclass, of the Royal Navy that was in service from December 1945, and which was scrapped in 1966.

Construction
The Royal Navy ordered Chequers on 24 July 1942, one of eight C-class "Intermediate" destroyers of the 1942 Programme. She was built by Scotts Shipbuilding and Engineering Company, Greenock, Scotland and commissioned in December 1945, too late for service during the Second World War.

Service
Chequers was assigned to, and became leader of, the 1st Destroyer Squadron based at Malta between 1948 and 1954.  She saw service, along with other Royal Navy ships, in preventing illegal immigration into Palestine in 1947. She was given an interim modernisation in 1954, which saw her 'X' turret at the rear of the ship replaced by two Squid anti-submarine mortars.

Decommissioning and disposal
Chequers was decommissioned and placed in Operational reserve in 1954. She was placed on the disposal list in 1964. She was sold to John Cashmore Ltd for scrapping and arrived at their yard in Newport, Wales on 23 July 1966.

References

Publications

1944 ships
Ships built on the River Clyde
C-class destroyers (1943) of the Royal Navy
World War II destroyers of the United Kingdom
Cold War destroyers of the United Kingdom